Emery House, and variations, may refer to:
William H. Emery Jr. House, Elmhurst, IL, listed on the NRHP in Illinois
Emery Hall, Wilberforce, OH, listed on the NRHP in Ohio
James Emery House, Bucksport, ME, listed on the NRHP in Maine
Emery House (Highpine, Maine), listed on the NRHP in Maine
Steward–Emery House, North Anson, ME, listed on the NRHP in Maine
Emery Homestead, Sanford, ME, listed on the NRHP in Maine
Smith–Emery House, Springvale, ME, listed on the NRHP in Maine
Emery Houses, Lansing, MI, listed on the NRHP in Michigan
Abram Emery House, Zanesville, OH, listed on the NRHP in Ohio
Welsh–Emery House, Richeyville, PA, listed on the NRHP in Pennsylvania
Emery Farmstead, Port Angeles, WA, listed on the NRHP in Washington